Syllepte guilboti is a moth in the family Crambidae. It was described by Christian Guillermet in 2008. It is found on Réunion in the Indian Ocean.

References

Moths described in 2008
guilboti
Moths of Africa